Shedd is a surname likely derived from 'de Schedde', the descendants of John de Schedde of Edwardstone, Suffolk, England.

In 1920 it was estimated that up to 70% of those with the Shedd name in the United States were descended from a Daniel Shed from Finchingfield, Essex, England.

Daniel Shed arrived in Braintree, Massachusetts about 1643 and homesteaded land in what is now Germantown in Quincy, Massachusetts. Until about 1750 Germantown was known as "Shed's Neck". After arrival in the Massachusetts Colony, Daniel Shed and his descendants changed the spelling of their surname. Daniel Shedd went on to be one of the founding settlers of Billerica, Massachusetts. His descendants include businessman and philanthropist John G. Shedd, and theologian William Greenough Thayer Shedd.

People 

 Dennis Shedd
 John G. Shedd
 Marjory Shedd
 William Greenough Thayer Shedd
 William Ambrose Shedd

Sources
 Shedd, Frank; Gardner Bartlett, J. (1921), Ancestry and Descendants of Daniel Shed of Braintree, Massachusetts 1327-1920, Shedd Family Association

Surnames